Carrer Gran de Gràcia is the main street of Gràcia, a district of Barcelona, Spain.

Gran de Gràcia is a shopping street that has been the centre of the district's commercial area since the time when Gràcia was a separate town, until 1897. It stretches from the West side of Passeig de Gràcia towards Plaça Lesseps.

Transport

Metro
Diagonal (L5, L3, L6)
Fontana (L3)
Lesseps (L3)

See also
Passeig de Gràcia

External links
Gran de Gràcia at Bcn.es
Eix Gran de Gràcia.com

Streets in Barcelona
Gràcia
Shopping districts and streets in Catalonia